Clarence Rose (born December 8, 1957) is an American professional golfer who has played on the PGA Tour, Nationwide Tour, and Champions Tour.

Rose was born in Goldsboro, North Carolina, where he makes his home today. He attended Clemson University and was a member of the golf team, an All-American in 1980. He turned pro and joined the PGA Tour in 1981.

Rose has more than two dozen top-10 finishes including one win and six runners-up in official PGA Tour events. He captured his first victory at the 1996 Sprint International in his 16th year on the Tour. His best finish in a major championship was T40 at the 1988 U.S. Open.

Rose took a hiatus from competitive golf in 1990 after learning his 18-month-old son, Clark, had testicular cancer. He played in just 18 events from 1992–1995. He established the Clarence Rose Foundation to help needy children in Wayne County, North Carolina.

After turning 50, Rose played several events on the Champions Tour.

Amateur wins
1979 North Carolina Amateur

Professional wins (3)

PGA Tour wins (1)

PGA Tour playoff record (1–1)

Nike Tour wins (1)

*Note: The 1995 Nike Pensacola Classic was shortened to 54 holes due to rain.

Other wins (1)
1997 JCPenney Classic (with Amy Fruhwirth)

Results in major championships

Note: Rose never played in The Open Championship

CUT = missed the half-way cut
"T" indicates a tie for a place

See also
Spring 1981 PGA Tour Qualifying School graduates
1995 PGA Tour Qualifying School graduates
1998 PGA Tour Qualifying School graduates

References

External links

American male golfers
Clemson Tigers men's golfers
PGA Tour golfers
PGA Tour Champions golfers
Golfers from North Carolina
People from Goldsboro, North Carolina
1957 births
Living people